The Compagnie générale du Maroc  (General Company of Morocco), known as "Genaroc",  is a French financial holding company founded in February 1912 by a consortium of French banks headed by the Bank of Paris and the Netherlands.

In 1914, it teamed with :fr:Lyonnaise des Eaux to create the Moroccan Society of Distribution of Water, Gas and Electricity (SMD).

It then took part in the creation of the :fr:Compagnie des chemins de fer du Maroc (Railway Company of Morocco), and it became one of the two main shareholders of the :fr:Compagnie franco-espagnole du chemin de fer de Tanger à Fès (Franco-Spanish Company of the Tangier Railway in Fez).

References 
 Jacques Boudet, Le monde des affaires en France de 1830 à nos jours, 1952
 Abdelali Benamour, Intermédiation financière et développement économique du Maroc, 1971
 Georges Hatton, Les enjeux financiers et économiques du Protectorat marocain (1936-1956): politique publique et investisseurs privés, 2009

Holding companies of France